Nick Hak (born 13 May 1997) is a Dutch football player who plays for SV TEC.

Club career
He made his professional debut in the Eerste Divisie for FC Dordrecht on 21 October 2016 in a game against Almere City FC.

Hak joined SV TEC in January 2019.

References

External links
 

1997 births
Living people
Dutch footballers
FC Dordrecht players
FC Lienden players
SV TEC players
Eerste Divisie players
Derde Divisie players
Association football forwards
Sportspeople from Buren
Footballers from Gelderland
21st-century Dutch people